Étienne Delessert (born 4 January 1941 in Lausanne) is a self-taught Swiss graphic artist and illustrator. He is largely known for his animated series Yok-Yok and his collaboration with Eugène Ionesco, Stories 1,2,3,4, as well as his work with child psychologist Jean Piaget. 
His work focuses on expanding the child's mind through the use of strange stories often designed to make children ask questions. He considers himself first and foremost a story teller. His creative process involves mostly digital media in combination with hand sketching.

For his lasting contribution as a children's illustrator, Delessert was a finalist for the biennial, international Hans Christian Andersen Award in both 2006 and 2010.

Career
Delessert has children's book published and translated in over 14 different languages. He has also had illustrations published in TIME magazine. He also animated segments for Sesame Street, like one about a woman's face morphing. Additionally, in 1973 Delessert illustrated a children's book based on the lyrics to "Being Green", a popular song written by Joe Raposo, originally performed by Jim Henson as Kermit the Frog on both Sesame Street and The Muppet Show. Although released as a Sesame Street book, the large hardcover book does not feature Kermit the Frog or other characters from the series. Rather, the song's lyrics are enacted by an undefined, dinosaur-like being.  The illustrations also do not feature any other traditional Sesame Street characters and are of a psychedelic nature. The book has been out of print since 1973. He also created the animated series Yok Yok for Swiss television.

Bibliography
Delessert, Etienne, interview by Jules. "Many Questions Over Breakfast with Etienne Delessert (Why Stop at Six?)" blaine.org, (3 10, 2011).

References

External links
 
 
 

1941 births
Living people
Swiss children's book illustrators
Swiss graphic designers
Swiss illustrators